Sega Bass Fishing 2, known in Japan as , is a video game developed by WOW Entertainment and published by Sega for the Dreamcast in 2001. It is the sequel to Sega Bass Fishing.

Gameplay
While the game can be played with the standard Dreamcast controller, it was designed to support the console's Fishing Controller. The game is single-player.

Development
Sega Bass Fishing 2 was developed as a sequel to Sega Bass Fishing. Originally an arcade game, its Dreamcast port in 1999 had been unexpectedly successful.

Reception

Sega Bass Fishing 2 received generally favorable reviews, according to the review aggregation website Metacritic. Edge cited the game's emphasis on simulation over arcade elements as a downside, compared to the arcade style of the first one. Conversely, GameSpot lauded the game as "a model example of what sequels should be." However, Eric Bratcher of NextGen said that the game was "More realistic, but not more fun. This is easily Sega's deepest fishing title, but it's alternately too hard or too easy." In Japan, Famitsu gave it a score of 27 out of 40.

See also
Sega Marine Fishing

References

External links

2001 video games
Dreamcast games
Dreamcast-only games
Fishing video games
Sega video games
Single-player video games
Video game sequels
Video games developed in Japan
WOW Entertainment games